Boy with a Dog is a 1655-1660 oil on canvas painting by Bartolomé Esteban Murillo, now in the Hermitage Museum, in Saint Petersburg, for which it was acquired from the Comte de Choiseul collection in 1772.

The painting represents a ragged, mischievous and cheerful boy, playing with a dog, and which is the thematic model of many paintings by Murillo, children victims of the hardship that in the mid-seventeenth century affected a Seville drowned by the taxes and the competition of Cádiz, after the plague of 1649.

References

1660 paintings
Paintings by Bartolomé Esteban Murillo
Paintings in the collection of the Hermitage Museum
Genre paintings